''Haplochromis'' sp. 'parvidens-like' is a species of fish in the family Cichlidae. It is endemic to Uganda.

References

Haplochromis
Endemic freshwater fish of Uganda
Undescribed vertebrate species
Taxonomy articles created by Polbot